Kalle Havulinna (September 27, 1924 – July 9, 2016) was a Finnish professional ice hockey player who played in the top professional league in Finland, the SM-liiga.  He played 10 seasons with the Tampere Ilves.  He was inducted into the Finnish Hockey Hall of Fame in 1985.  Besides ice hockey he worked as an electrical engineer.  His company was responsible for the electrics of Finland's first ice rink in Tampere, built for the 1965 Ice Hockey World Championships.

References

External links
 Finnish Hockey Hall of Fame bio

1924 births
2016 deaths
Finnish ice hockey players
Ilves players